Saint Romulus of Fiesole is venerated as the patron saint of Fiesole, Italy. Romulus was probably a local deacon, priest, or bishop of the 1st century.

According to tradition, he was a disciple of Saint Peter and had been converted to Christianity by the apostle.  This tradition states that Romulus became the first bishop of Fiesole and was martyred during the reign of Domitian along with four companions: Carissimus, Dulcissimus, Marchis(i)anus, and Crescentius.

He was not named as a bishop or martyr in documents dating from 966; however, a document from 1028 names him as such.  From then on, Romulus was considered a martyred bishop of Fiesole, and his companions were named as Carissimus, Dulcissimus, Marchis(i)anus (Marchiziano), and Crescentius.  Their feast day was listed as 6 July in the 1468 Florentine edition of the Martyrology of Usuard, and in the 16th century, his name began to appear in the Roman Martyrology, where he was named as a disciple of Saint Peter.

As Antonio Borrelli remarks, sometime between the end of the 10th century and the beginning of the eleventh, Romulus was "upgraded" from being considered a Confessor of the Faith to a martyr, possibly by a local abbot named Teuzo.

An 11th-century legend associated with him, considered "worthless", makes him an illegitimate son of a woman named Lucerna, who had a child with her father's slave, who was named Cyrus.  Like the Romulus of ancient Roman legend, this Romulus was also abandoned and suckled by a she-wolf.  He was captured, baptized and raised by Saint Peter and Peter's companion Justin.  Romulus then evangelized much of central Italy and was put to death by the governor Repertian.

The most ancient image depicting Romulus is the 1440 polyptych in Fiesole Cathedral, where he is represented with Saints Alexander, Peter and Donatus.

References

Books

External links
 San Romolo di Fiesole
 Cattedrale di San Romolo

Bishops in Tuscany
1st-century Christian martyrs
1st-century Romans
Year of birth unknown
She-wolf (Roman mythology)